The men's javelin throw at the 2022 World Athletics U20 Championships was held at the Estadio Olímpico Pascual Guerrero on 4 and 5 August.

20 athletes from 15 countries were entered to the competition, however 18 athletes from 14 countries were on the final entry list.

Records
U20 standing records prior to the 2022 World Athletics U20 Championships were as follows:

Results

Qualification
The qualification started on 4 August at 09:00. Athletes attaining a mark of at least 72.50 metres ( Q ) or at least the 12 best performers ( q ) qualified for the final.

Final

References

Javelin throw
Javelin throw at the World Athletics U20 Championships